The Macedonian women's First League of Handball, is the top-tier team handball competition in the Republic of North Macedonia.

2016/2017 Skopsko Super Liga

Champions

Winners by season

Performances

References

External links
 Macedonian Handball Federation  
 Macedonian Handball Forum
 Balkan Handball Federation

Women's handball in North Macedonia
Women's handball leagues
Handball